"Chaser Game" (stylized all caps) is a song recorded by Japanese voice actress and singer Maaya Uchida. It will be released on September 16, 2022 as Uchida's first digital single. It is being used as the opening theme for the television drama of the same name. The song was later decided to be included in Uchida's 14th single released on January 25, 2023, Loudhailer.

Track listings

Recorded single

References

2022 singles
2022 songs
J-pop songs
Japanese-language songs
Pony Canyon singles